The following is an episode list for the MTV Tr3́s series Isa TKM.

Lists of American children's television series episodes